Ranunculus septentrionalis, the swamp buttercup, is a species of buttercup found in North America from New Brunswick to Manitoba and from Georgia to Kansas.  Although some authors treat it as a distinct species, others consider it to be a subspecies of Ranunculus hispidus.

References

Flora of North America
septentrionalis